Why Do We Shake in the Cold? is the debut studio album by British electronic musician Elderbrook. It was released on 18 September 2020 through Parlophone Records. The album includes his most recent charted hit "Something About You" with Rudimental.

Track listing

Notes
  signifies an additional producer

References

2020 debut albums
Parlophone albums